Typhoon Tapah, known in the Philippines as Typhoon Nimfa was a Category 1 equivalent typhoon that caused damages in Japan and South Korea. The seventeenth named storm and the seventh typhoon of the 2019 Pacific typhoon season, Tapah formed on September 17 from the remnants of Tropical Depression Marilyn.

Meteorological history

On September 17, a tropical depression formed from the remnants of Tropical Depression Marilyn east of Batanes. The PAGASA later named the tropical cyclone as "Nimfa" as it entered its area of responsibility, with the JTWC issuing a medium warning.  A non-warning tropical depression in the South China Sea merged with the circulation of Tapah on Thursday, September 19. 
On September 21, Tapah exited the PAR, with the PAGASA issuing its last advisory on it. Tapah intensified further as it passed the Ryukyu Islands, intensifying into a typhoon as per the JMA. Later, Tapah weakened into a severe tropical storm, as its wind field diameter expanded. Tapah then began to rapidly weaken, transitioning into an extratropical storm on September 23 at 00:00 UTC. Then, by 18:00 UTC of the same day, the extratropical remnants of Tapah fully dissipated in the Sea of Japan.

Preparation
JMA issued a red warning for stormy weather and high waves over the coastal Prefectures of central and northern Honshu. Moderate rainfall to locally heavy rainfall was forecasted for the area.

Impact and aftermath
Across the Okinawa and the Miyazaki Prefecture, 21 people were injured and regional authorities had issued evacuation advisories for more than 2,000 people. In addition, media reported that more than 400 flights were canceled and that several railway disruptions and power outages affected around 28,500 buildings.
During the passage of Tapah, three people were killed in Japan, and the agricultural damage amounted to ¥583 million (US$5.42 million). Damages in South Korea were at ₩2.96 billion (US$2.48 million). Though three deaths were reported during the storm, officials said that they were not related to Tapah.

See also

Weather of 2019
Tropical cyclones in 2019

References

External links

Storm